Water Rats is an Australian TV police procedural broadcast on the Nine Network from 1996 to 2001. The series was based on the work of the men and women of the Sydney Water Police who fight crime around Sydney Harbour and surrounding locales. The show was set on and around Goat Island in Sydney Harbour.

Water Rats premiered on 12 February 1996, and ran for six seasons and 177 episodes. Colin Friels and Catherine McClements were the original stars of the series and were instrumental in the show's early success. They both departed the show in 1999. In later seasons, Steve Bisley, Aaron Pedersen and Dee Smart became the show's main stars.

For the sixth and final season in 2001, the show concentrated more on the cops' personal lives rather than just focusing on the crimes committed. The Nine Network cancelled the show after six seasons. Executive Producer Kris Noble blamed escalating costs for the cancellation. However, the series had been suffering a ratings decline following the departure of Friels and McClements in 1999.

The final episode was broadcast in Australia on 7 August 2001.

Cast
 Colin Friels as Det Snr Constable Frank Holloway (1996–1999)
 Catherine McClements as Det Snr Constable Rachel Goldstein (1996–1999)
 Steve Bisley as Det Sergeant Jack Christey (1998–2001)
 Jay Laga'aia as Snr Const Tommy Tavita (1996–2000)
 Aaron Pedersen as Det Constable Michael Reilly (1999–2001)
 Dee Smart as Det Snr Constable Alex St. Clare (2000–2001)

Supporting cast
 Peter Bensley as Snr Sgt/Chief Insp Jeff Hawker (1996–2001)
 Bill Young as Chief Insp Clarke Webb (1996 only)
 Brett Partridge as Snr Constable Gavin Sykes (1996–2001)
 Toni Scanlan as Snr Sgt Helen Blakemore (1996–2001)
 Scott Burgess as Snr Sgt Dave McCall (1996–1999)
 Aaron Jeffery as Constable Terry Watson (1996–1998)
 Sophie Heathcote as Constable Fiona Cassidy (1996–1997)
 Raelee Hill as Constable Tayler Johnson (1997–1999)
 Allison Cratchley as Constable Emma Woods (1998–2001)
 Diarmid Heidenreich as Constable Matthew Quinn (2000–2001)
 Rebecca Smart as Constable Donna Janevski (2000–2001)
 Tom McCrickard as sickly drug addict Stringy Oscar (1996-1999)
 Blake Power as Jewish school child (1996-1999)

Recurring roles 

 Peter Mochrie as Detective Snr Sergeant John Harrison (22 episodes, 1996)
 Jeremy Callaghan as Detective Snr Constable Kevin Holloway (10 episodes, 1996)
 Richard Healy as Insp Tony Brady (14 episodes, 1996–1997)
 Treffyn Koreshoff as David Goldstein (17 episodes, 1996–1999)
 John Walton as John Walton (26 episodes, 1997–1999)
 Anthony Martin as Colin "Chopper" Lewis (44 episodes, 1997–2001)
 Mouche Phillips as Eva Minton (8 episodes, 2000–2001) 
 Brooke Satchwell as Sophie Ferguson (20 episodes, 2000–2001)
 Joss McWilliam as Sgt Lance Rorke (29 episodes, 2000–2001)

Season summaries

Pilot

The first episode of Water Rats screened in Australia at 8.30 pm on Monday, 12 February 1996. It was entitled Dead in the Water and was a two-part episode. Dead in the Water introduced viewers to Detective Senior Constables Frank Holloway and Rachel Goldstein.

Along with:
 Chief Inspector Clarke Webb
 Senior Sergeant Jeff Hawker
 Sergeant Helen Blakemore
 Senior Sergeant Dave McCall
 Senior Constable Gavin Sykes
 Senior Constable Tommy Tavita
 Senior Constable Fiona Cassidy
 Senior Constable Terry Watson
and
 Detective Senior Sergeant John "Knocker" Harrison (played by Peter Mochrie)
 Detective Senior Constable Kevin Holloway (played by Jeremy Callaghan)
 David Goldstein (played by Treffyn Koreshoff)
 Jonathon Goldstein (played by Steven Grivies)
 Inspector Tony Brady (played by Richard Healy)
 Prison Warden (played by Christopher Barry)

The pilot plot concerned a divorced man, deranged over the death of his daughter, who captures a Sydney harbour ferry and holds the city to ransom.

Season one
Season one ran for 26 episodes and major storylines included:
 Jonathon Goldstein trying to deny Rachel access to their young son, David.
 Frank's relationship with crime scene officer, Caroline Cox.
 Helen's sexuality comes out in the open, particularly to Rachel, who seemed to be the only character who did not know Helen was gay.
 The death and subsequent investigation of Frank's brother, Kevin.
 Rachel's relationship with Knocker, which turned out to be a deadly one.
 Clarke's affair and his subsequent resignation.
 Frank being investigated by Internal Affairs on two occasions.

Season two
The second season of Water Rats ran, again, for 26 episodes and began airing on Monday, 10 February 1997. Season two also took the detectives to Melbourne, a change from Sydney harbour. It also introduced a new character, Constable Tayler Johnson, as well as a few minor ones, including:
 Colin "Chopper" Lewis (played by Anthony Martin)
 Senior Constable Sam Bailey (played by Kelly Dale)
 Michael Jefferies (played by John Adam)
 Gail Hawker (played by Anne Tenney)

Major storylines included:
 Rachel's relationship with the well-off Michael Jefferies.
 Jeff becomes Chief Inspector.
 Frank once again, is investigated by I.A, but this time for a much more serious offence, murder.
 Tayler is Helen's niece.
 Terry is stabbed and decides to leave the Water Police.
 Dave is speared by spear gun and cannot continue diving.
 Jeff and his wife separate.

Season three
Season three ran for 31 episodes and premiered on Monday, 9 February 1998. A couple of episodes into the season, it was moved to Tuesday nights. Steve Bisley is also added to the opening credits for a number of episodes near the end of the season. New characters included:
 Constable Emma Woods
 Liz Robinson (played by Rebecca Hobbs)
 Detective Senior Constable Jack Christey
 Detective Sergeant Louise Bradshaw (played by Sonia Todd)
 Terry Madigan (played by Ritchie Singer)

Major storylines included:
 Frank getting back together (for a while) with his ex-wife Liz.
 Rachel and tough-talking detective Jack Christey have a one-night stand.
 Tayler is shot.
 Rachel works with Tommy on a number of occasions, while Frank is away.
 Frank's relationship with undercover cop Louise ends when she is shot dead.
 Helen is promoted to Senior Sergeant.

Season four
The fourth series began on Tuesday, 16 February 1999 and ran for 32 episodes. It was a series of change for Water Rats, which included both Colin Friels' and Catherine McClements' departures within 18 episodes of each other. It introduced some new and old characters such as:
 Detective Senior Constable Michael Reilly
 Detective Sergeant Jack Christey
 Gillian Swain (played by Liz Burch)
 Suzi Abromavich (played by Roxane Wilson, who also appeared in one episode in series three)
 Detective Senior Constable Alex St Clare

Major storylines included:
 Helen's relationship with lawyer Gillian Swain.
 Michael Reilly, from VIP security, becomes the third detective.
 Frank leaves the Water Police, sailing to Venezuela.
 Jack replaces Frank and his relationship with Rachel gets off to a rocky start.
 Jack is promoted to Detective Sergeant.
 David is kidnapped.
 Rachel and Jack start their relationship again.
 Rachel is stabbed, and dies in Jack's arms.
 Jeff and his wife get a divorce.
 Tayler leaves the Water Police, joining Pol-Air.
 Alex St Clare replaces Rachel.

Season five
The fifth season began airing on Tuesday, 22 February 2000, and ran for 36 episodes, the longest out of the six seasons of the show. Ratings began to fall slightly, as a result of McClements' departure the previous year. A number of regular characters also left, including Jay Laga'aia and Scott Burgess, whose character was not seen at all in series five, and his whereabouts was finally mentioned in series six. New characters included:
 Senior Constable Matthew Quinn
 Constable Donna Janevski
 Sergeant Lance Rorke
 Sophie Ferguson
 Eva Minton (played by Mouche Phillips)

Major storylines included:
 Tommy leaves the Water Police and goes on long-service leave.
 Jack finds out he has an 18-year-old daughter named Sophie.
 Mick asks Alex out on a date.
 Gavin meets Eva.
 Jack remembers Rachel on the one-year anniversary of her death.

Season six
The sixth and final season of Water Rats began airing on Tuesday, 6 February 2001 and ran for 26 episodes. Sometime early in the season, the timeslot was changed from 8.30 pm to 9.30 pm. The Nine Network decided to cancel the show, due to escalating costs and declining ratings, and two main stars, Bisley and Smart had decided to leave the show. Notable new characters in the final season included:
 Acting Inspector Julia Goodwin (played by Josephine Byrnes)
 Tom Christey (played by Bill Hunter)
 Sergeant Vanessa Simmons (played by Ingrid Ruz)
 Detective George Newhouse (played by Rodger Corser)

Major storylines included:
 Jack has a short relationship with Julia Goodwin.
 Lance dies in a freak accident.
 Sophie begins her Police training.
 The Water Police learn that Snr. Sgt. Dave McCall has died.
 Gavin and Eva get married, and at the end of the series, have a baby.
 Jack is shot in the very last episode, and though not known, probably dies, as Steve Bisley was leaving the show if it did continue for another season.

Episodes

Awards and nominations

Filming locations
Water Rats was filmed on and around Goat Island in Sydney Harbour. Other locations used throughout the series were:
 Shark Island
 Sydney Harbour Bridge − In the season three episode Epiphany, Matt Barnes took Rachel Goldstein and climbed the famous bridge for a negotiators exercise.
 The Gap − A main storyline of season 1 was the murder of Frank's brother Kevin, who was thrown off The Gap.
 White Bay Power Station − Used a number of times, most notably, Catherine McClements' last episode A Day at the Office.
 Fort Denison
 The Rocks − Mainly used for external shots of Frank's house.
 Middle Harbour
 Long Bay Correctional Centre
 Australian Army Artillery Museum − During the season two final, Rachel and Frank search for killer Brian Atkins in the tunnels of the museum.
 North Head
 Middle Head Fortifications
 Melbourne − In season two, Rachel and Frank travelled to Melbourne to investigate a murder.

Fictional locations
The real Sydney Water Police headquarters was located at Pyrmont. The TV version of the Sydney Water Police headquarters was located on Goat Island, though the fictional address was 48/50 Harbour Drive, Sydney 2000. Other fictional locations throughout the series included:
 Frank's House − The exterior was shot in The Rocks, but the interior was a set on Goat Island.
 The Cutter Bar − A fictional pub, where the members of the Water Police liked to relax after a hard day at work (introduced in season two).
 The Sydney Police Centre − Unlike some other police stations, the Water Police did not have their own holding cells, so offenders were taken to the SPC to be charged.
 The Hospital
 The Morgue − Early in the series, real morgues were used to film in. Eventually a set was built on Goat Island.
 Rachel's house − A number of different exterior locations were used for Rachel's house, including Balmain, Birchgrove and Glebe.

Home media
Water Rats was first released on DVD in 2004 through Shock Entertainment. It was released as two parts called Series 1 and Series 2, though it was actually only season 1 in two parts. Warner Vision Australia then released the rest of the show, where DVDs labelled series 3 were actually season 2 and so on. It was announced on 7 August 2017 that Via Vision Entertainment would re-release all six seasons on DVD on 22 November 2017. Several episodes are out of broadcast order in the Via Vision collection and on Amazon Prime.

DVDs

Online streaming availability 

All episodes are available on Amazon Prime in Australia.

Soundtrack 

A Water Rats soundtrack was produced by Les Gock in 1999. It contained songs featured on the series, such as "Goldie's Theme" by Cathi Ogden (heard in many episodes, most notably episode 109) and "I'll Dream of You" by Hugh Wilson (heard in Frank's final episode). It also features a couple of songs sung by cast members: "Breathe" with Raelee Hill and "Let's Party" with Jay Laga'aia. The song "Breathe" was written by James Freud, who also sang in the chorus. The company Song Zu seems to want to have no affiliation with the soundtrack music and does not recognise nor acknowledge it on its current website. Secondhand copies of it can occasionally be found on auction sites and in secondhand music stores.

International broadcasting
The series is currently being re-run in:

  on Foxtel's Hallmark Channel
  on RTÉ One, Sunday and Monday mornings
  on Kanal9. From 10.06.2013 on DR1
  on FX
  on City 7
  on ICTV
  on France 2

Notes
 There was a 2003 National Film and Sound Archive, Canberra exhibition on Australian police dramas (1950–present) that featured some scripts from the show, as well as a plastic corpse used in one episode. See National Archives of Australia for details.
 The exterior for Frank's house was filmed near the Agar Steps in The Rocks, New South Wales; however, the interior was shot on Goat Island.
 Catherine McClements had previously worked with Colin Friels in the movie Weekend with Kate (1990), Scott Burgess in the movie Just Us (1986) and Tony Morphett (the creator of Water Rats) in the telemovie My Brother Tom (1986).
 Season three originally contained 32 episodes; however, because of Colin Friels' illness, only 31 went to air.

See also
 List of Australian television series
 List of Nine Network programs

References

External links
 
 Water Rats
 Water Rats
 Water Rats fan forum
Water Rats at the National Film and Sound Archive
Water Rats - "Goes with Territory" at Australian Screen Online

1990s Australian drama television series
1990s Australian crime television series
Nautical television series
Nine Network original programming
Television shows set in Sydney
1996 Australian television series debuts
2001 Australian television series endings
Television series by Endemol Australia
2000s Australian drama television series
2000s Australian crime television series